Inside Out is an album released in 1973 by British singer-songwriter John Martyn. His fifth solo album, it was also his most experimental, and the jazziest album in his catalog. The album features two that are favourites with his fans, "Fine Lines" and "Make No Mistake", as well as two songs that he enjoyed playing live as jazz epics, "Outside In" and "Look In".

An 18-minute live version of "Outside In" appears on Martyn's self-distributed Live at Leeds album.

The song "Make No Mistake" references John Coltrane's "A Love Supreme".

Track listing
All tracks composed and arranged by John Martyn

 "Fine Lines" (3:49)
 "Eibhli Ghail Chiuin Ni Chearbhail" (Traditional; arranged by Martyn) (3:08)
 "Ain't No Saint" (3:36)
 "Outside In" (8:23)
 "The Glory of Love" (Billy Hill) (1:57)
 "Look In" (2:54)
 "Beverley" (3:55)
 "Make No Mistake" (5:58)
 "Ways To Cry" (2:59)
 "So Much in Love With You" (2:50)

Bonus tracks

"Beverley/Make No Mistake" (5:21)
"Fine Lines" (3:12)
"Eibhli Ghail Chiuin Ni Chearbhail" (2:57)
"Outside In" (7:48)
Bonus tracks 1–3 recorded 10 October 1973, for session for Bob Harris's show Sounds of the Seventies on BBC Radio 1; bonus track 4 recorded 23 May 1973, for same series

Personnel
John Martyn – vocals, guitar
Danny Thompson – bass, double bass
Chris Stewart – bass
Steve Winwood – bass, keyboards
Chris Wood – flute, horns
Remi Kabaka – percussion
Keshav Sathe – tabla
Bobby Keyes – saxophone

See also
Echoplex

References

External links
John Martyn's Website

John Martyn albums
1973 albums
Island Records albums